was a district located in Fukuoka Prefecture, Japan.

As of 2003, the district had an estimated population of 14,525 and a density of 354.18 persons per km2. The total area was 41.01 km2.

Former towns and villages 
Takata

Merger 
 On January 29, 2007 - the town of Takata, along with the towns of Setaka and Yamakawa (both from Yamato District), was merged to create the city of Miyama.

Former districts of Fukuoka Prefecture
Ōmuta, Fukuoka